Dainius is a Lithuanian name

List of people named Dainius

Dainius Adomaitis (born 1974), retired Lithuanian basketball player
Dainius Gleveckas (born 1977), Lithuanian football defender currently playing for FK Ekranas 
Dainius Šuliauskas (born  1973), retired Lithuanian football defender, who last played for FK Sūduva Marijampolė
Dainius Kairelis (born  1979),  Lithuanian road bicycle racer 
Dainius Kamaitis (born  1965), Lithuanian diplomat, ambassador
Dainius Kreivys (born 1970), politician, Minister of Economy of Lithuania
Dainius Saulėnas (born 1979), Lithuanian football Forward who plays for FK Vidzgiris Alytus
Dainius Šalenga (born 1977),  Lithuanian basketball player for BC Rūdupis
Dainius Virbickas (born 1971),  retired Lithuanian long-distance runner 
Dainius Zubrus (born  1978), Lithuanian  ice hockey right winger and center

Lithuanian masculine given names